Brian Robert Bowsher  (born 12 July 1957) is a British chemist, and was the Chief Executive of the Science and Technology Facilities Council (STFC) between November 2016 and March 2018. He is also a non-executive member of the board for the Defence Science and Technology Board (Dstl).

Early life
He was born in Birmingham. He attended Handsworth Grammar School then Fosters Grammar School (now Foster's School) in Dorset. From the University of Southampton he obtained a BSc degree in Chemistry in 1978 and then received a PhD degree in 1981.

Career
He was Managing Director of the National Physical Laboratory from 2009 to 2015. From 2002 to 2009 he had various division-head and director roles at the Atomic Weapons Establishment.

Personal life
He married Sally Smith in 1987 and they have one son. He lives in Wareham, Dorset.

References 

 ‘BOWSHER, Brian Robert’, Who's Who 2011, A & C Black, 2011; online edn, Oxford University Press, Dec 2010 ; online edn, Oct 2010 accessed 28 July 2011
 NPL

External links
 STFC

 

1957 births
Living people
Alumni of the University of Southampton
British chemists
Fellows of the Institute of Physics
Fellows of the Royal Society of Chemistry
Officers of the Order of the British Empire
People educated at Foster's School
People educated at Handsworth Grammar School
People from Birmingham, West Midlands
People from Wareham, Dorset
Science and Technology Facilities Council
Scientists of the National Physical Laboratory (United Kingdom)